Ashok Chandulal Bhatt (1939-2010) was an Indian politician from Gujarat state, affiliated with Bharatiya Jana Sangh and Bharatiya Janata Party. He was the Speaker of the Gujarat Legislative Assembly when he died.

Political career 

He entered public life in 1956 through Mahagujarat Movement and joined the Jansangh in 1960. He was very vocal in favour of banning gutka and other tobacco products altogether in the state. He also took part in Nav Nirman Movement. He was BJP's losing candidate from Ahmedabad (Lok Sabha constituency) in 1984. But he was elected from Khadia seat to Gujarat Vidhan Sabha eight times in a row. In 1975, as Jana Sangh candidate, and then eight times in a row from 1980 to 2007 as member of BJP. He was Minister for Health, Law and Justice for the Government of Gujarat when Keshubhai Patel was CM. Bhatt was forced to resign along with Harin Pathak who was Minister of State for Defence Production in center government in a case of instigating a mob leading to the lynching of Head Constable Laxman Desai during an anti-quota agitation in Gujarat in April 1985.     

Later he was the speaker of the assembly at the time of his death.

Personal life 

Bhatt was married to Jyoti, the couple had one daughter and three sons, including Bhushan Bhatt who was a member of the Gujarat Legislative Assembly from Jamalpur-Khadiya from 2012 to 2017 but lost in 2017 elections. 
Bhatt died due to multiple organ failure in SAL Hospital in Ahmedabad on 29 September 2010 at 10:45pm where he was undergoing treatment of a heart problem for nearly three weeks.

References

1939 births
2010 deaths
Politicians from Ahmedabad
Gujarat MLAs 1980–1985
Gujarat MLAs 1985–1990
Gujarat MLAs 1990–1995

Gujarat MLAs 1995–1998
Gujarat MLAs 1998–2002
Gujarat MLAs 2007–2012

Speakers of the Gujarat Legislative Assembly
Bharatiya Janata Party politicians from Gujarat
Gujarat MLAs 1975–1980
Gujarat MLAs 2002–2007